Calix Limited is an Australian technology company whose core technology is a "kiln" built in Bacchus Marsh that produces "mineral honeycomb". Calix's technology includes work on CO2 capture to address global sustainability challenges across several industries including wastewater treatment, aquaculture, advanced energy storage and cement / lime production.

Products 
Calix's products include ACTI-Mag, BOOSTER-Mag and AQUA-Cal+.

ACTI-Mag - Wastewater management
AQUA-Cal+ - Sustainable aquaculture farming, lake & pond remediation
BOOSTER-Mag - Crop protection

History 
The origins of Calix began in 2005, with work on flash calcining. In 2007 their first pilot calciner facility was built to test what was possible with a fully established CFC 850 calciner plant at Bacchus Marsh in 2011. In 2012 Calix acquired mining tenements at Myrtle Springs, South Australia. Between 2013 and 2017 Calix established a plant in South East Asia and won several awards and funding for a variety of sustainable technologies including Advanced Battery research, and Agricultural applications. Calix listed publicly in the Australian Securities Exchange (ASX) in 2018 and in coordination with the LEILAC (Low Emissions Intensity Lime & Cement) project in Europe, began construction of a pilot plant in Lixhe, Belgium. In 2019 Calix acquired the US-based company Inland Empire Resources.

Project LEILAC 
Calix is a key partner in, and provides the core technology towards, Project LEILAC (Low Emissions Intensity Lime & Cement), as part of Horizon 2020, a programme established by the European Commission.

Financial information 
Calix Limited is a listed Australian public company, having listed on the Australian Securities Exchange (ASX) in 2018. Prior to its listing, Calix was backed by investors including Och-Ziff Capital Management Group and Washington H Soul Pattinson. Since its foundation in 2005, Calix Limited has to date committed more than $40 million to commercialising its technologies and processes.

References 

 
 Building a Better World With Green Cement, By Michael Rosenwald. Smithsonian, December 2011

External links 
 
 LEILAC Project

Climate change mitigation
Energy storage
Biotechnology
Companies based in Sydney
Companies of Australia
Chemical companies of Australia
Technology companies established in 2005
Australian companies established in 2005